This article contains the list of candidates associated with the 2008 Russian presidential election.

Registered candidates
Candidates are listed in the order they appear on the ballot paper (alphabetical order in Russian).

Withdrawn candidates

Rejected candidates
The following candidates were denied registration by the CEC:

Declared candidates who withdrew without registering
Many Russian politicians publicly indicated their intention to run for president in 2008, but failed to submit their nominations:

Garry Kasparov, former World Chess Champion and United Civil Front leader.  Before announcing his candidacy, he was previously inclined to endorse Viktor Gerashchenko. He failed to nominate by the deadline, citing government obstructions in finding a suitable congress venue as the reason.
 Alexander Donskoy, mayor of Arkhangelsk. He was charged with abuse of office, detained for several months and released on March 6, 2008 with a probationary sentence.
 Viktor Gerashchenko (campaign)– former head of the Central Bank and former deputy of the nationalist Rodina party who later joined the Other Russia coalition. He was initially the favored candidate of Garry Kasparov.
 Sergei Gulyayev – former St Petersburg Yabloko regional legislator who announced his intention to run, despite the fact that Yabloko's leader had also declared his intention to stand. Gulyayev was the fourth candidate from the Other Russia coalition to announce his candidacy.
 Gennadiy Seleznyov – former Speaker of the Duma (in 1995-2003); former member of the CPRF; leader of the socialist Party of Russia's Rebirth.

Possible candidates who did not run
The following individuals were included in some polls, were referred to in the media as possible candidates or had publicly expressed interest long before the elections but never announced that they would run.
Sergey Glazyev
Boris Gryzlov
Sergei Ivanov
Sergey Mironov
Vladimir Putin -constitutionally barred from running
Dmitry Rogozin
Sergey Shoygu
 Grigory Yavlinsky, leader of Yabloko, who also stood for the presidency in 1996 and in 2000. He was widely expected to run for the presidency as a candidate of united liberal parties. However, at the Yabloko congress on December 14, 2007, it was announced that Yavlinsky and his party would support the candidacy of Bukovsky.
Viktor Zubkov

Additionally:
 A Just Russia announced on December 7, 2007 that it would not nominate a candidate and instead would support another party's candidate (likely United Russia's).

References

 
2008